Kopetz is a surname. Notable people with the surname include:

 Barry Kopetz (born 1951), American music composer and conductor
 Hermann Kopetz (born 1943), Austrian computer scientist
 Ladislaus Michael Kopetz (1902–1966), Austrian crop farming scientist
 Vera Kopetz (1910–1998), German painter and graphic artist
 Paul Kopetz (born 1968), Australian/Polish music composer, arranger, clarinettist, conductor, and music educator